was a  after Hōan and before Daiji. This period spanned the years from April 1124 through January 1126.

Change of era
 January 19, 1124 : The new era name was created to mark an event or series of events. The previous era ended and the new one commenced in Hōan 5, on the 3rd day of the 4th month of 1126.

Events of the Tenji era
 1124 (Tenji 1, 2nd month): Former-Emperor Horikawa and former-Emperor Toba went in carriages to outside the city where they could all together enjoy contemplating the flowers. Taiken-mon In (formerly Fujiwara no Shōshi), who was Toba's empress and Sutoku's mother, joined the procession along with many other women of the court. Their cortege was brilliant and colorful. A great many men of the court in hunting clothes followed the ladies in this parade. Fujiwara Tadamichi then followed in a carriage, accompanied by bands of musicians and women who were to sing for the emperors.
 1124 (Tenji 1, 10th month): Horikawa visited Mount Kōya.
 1125 (Tenji 2, 10th month): The emperor visited Iwashimizu Shrine and the Kamo Shrines; and afterward, he also visited the shrines Hirano, Ōharano, Mutsunoo, Kitano, Gion and several others.

Notes

References
 Brown, Delmer M. and Ichirō Ishida, eds. (1979).  Gukanshō: The Future and the Past. Berkeley: University of California Press. ;  OCLC 251325323
 Nussbaum, Louis-Frédéric and Käthe Roth. (2005).  Japan encyclopedia. Cambridge: Harvard University Press. ;  OCLC 58053128
 Titsingh, Isaac. (1834). Nihon Odai Ichiran; ou,  Annales des empereurs du Japon.  Paris: Royal Asiatic Society, Oriental Translation Fund of Great Britain and Ireland. OCLC 5850691
 Varley, H. Paul. (1980). A Chronicle of Gods and Sovereigns: Jinnō Shōtōki of Kitabatake Chikafusa. New York: Columbia University Press. ;  OCLC 6042764

External links
 National Diet Library, "The Japanese Calendar" -- historical overview plus illustrative images from library's collection

Japanese eras